Stobo may refer to:

Locations
Stobo, Scottish Borders, Scotland, see List of listed buildings in Stobo, Scottish Borders
Stobo Castle, Scotland
Stobo Kirk, Scotland
Stobo railway station, Scotland
Barony of Stobo, Scotland

People
Charlie Stobo, Australian cricketer
Richard Stobo, Australian cricketer
Robert Stobo, Scottish-American soldier